MCC Theater (Manhattan Class Company) is an off-Broadway theater company located in New York City. The theater was founded in 1986 by artistic directors Robert LuPone, Bernard Telsey and William Cantler. Blake West joined the company in 2006 as executive director. MCC opened the doors to its new home in Manhattan's Hell's Kitchen neighborhood, as The Robert W. Wilson MCC Theater Space, on January 9, 2019.

Mission 
MCC is one of New York's nonprofit off-Broadway companies, driven by a mission to provoke conversations that have never happened and otherwise never would. Founded in 1986 as a collective of artists leading peer-based classes to support their own development as actors, writers and directors, the tenets of collaboration, education, and community are at the core of MCC Theater's programming. One of the only theaters in the country led continuously by its founders, Artistic Directors Robert LuPone, Bernard Telsey, and William Cantler, MCC fulfills its mission through the production of world, American, and New York premiere plays and musicals that challenge artists and audiences to confront contemporary personal and social issues, and robust playwright development and education initiatives that foster the next generation of theater artists and students alike.

MCC Theater's celebrated productions include:
Jocelyn Bioh's School Girls; Or, the African Mean Girls Play
Penelope Skinner's The Village Bike
 Robert Askins' Hand to God (Broadway transfer; five 2015 Tony Award nominations including Best Play)
John Pollono's Small Engine Repair
Paul Downs Colaizzo's Really Really
Sharr White's The Other Place (Broadway transfer)
Jeff Talbott's The Submission (Laurents/Hatcher Award)
Neil LaBute's Reasons to Be Happy, Reasons to Be Pretty (Broadway transfer, three 2009 Tony Award nominations, including Best Play), Some Girl(s), Fat Pig, The Mercy Seat, and All The Ways To Say I Love You
Michael Weller's Fifty Words
Alexi Kaye Campbell's The Pride
Bryony Lavery's Frozen (Broadway transfer; four 2004 Tony Award nominations including Best Play, Tony Award for Best Featured Actor)
Tim Blake Nelson's The Grey Zone
Rebecca Gilman's The Glory of Living (2002 Pulitzer Prize finalist)
Margaret Edson's Wit (1999 Pulitzer Prize) and the musicals Coraline, Carrie, and Ride the Cyclone.

Many plays developed and produced by MCC have gone on to productions throughout the country and around the world.

Key players 
Robert LuPone – Artistic Director
Bernard Telsey – Artistic Director
William Cantler – Artistic Director
Blake West – Executive Director

Artists 
MCC has engaged a collection of notable directors and artists that have included:

 Lynn Redgrave
 Michael Greif
 Jo Bonney
 Doug Hughes
 Philip Seymour Hoffman
 Julianna Margulies
 Liev Schreiber
 Jim Simpson
 Benjamin Bratt
 Swoosie Kurtz
 Kathleen Chalfant
 Allison Janney
 Anna Paquin
 Judith Light
 Marisa Tomei
 Lili Taylor
 Sigourney Weaver
 Jeremy Piven
 Keri Russell
 Calista Flockhart
 Bridget Fonda
 Eric McCormack
 Fran Drescher
 Peter Hedges
 Jane Alexander
 Ron Livingston
 Ben Shenkman
 Maura Tierney
 Kyra Sedgwick
 Joanna Gleason
 Lisa Gay Hamilton
 Gil Bellows
 Polly Draper
 Thomas Gibson
 Michael C. Hall
 Lisa Harrow
 Derek Anson Jones
 Raúl Esparza
 John Spencer
 Kathleen Turner
 Stephin Merritt
 David Greenspan
 Piper Perabo
 Frederick Weller
 Sarah Paulson
 Dominic Chianese
 Hugh Dancy
 Ben Whishaw
 Charles Busch

Mainstage Productions 

2022–2024

 Only Gold by Kate Nash, Andy Blankenbuehler and Ted Malawer
 Wolf Play by Hansol Jung
 Bees and Honey by Guadalís Del Carmen
 Wet Brain by John J. Caswell, Jr.

2021–2022

 Nollywood Dreams by Jocelyn Bioh
 Space Dogs (musical) by Nick Blaemire and Van Hughes (actor/writer)
 Which Way to the Stage by Ana Nogueira
 Uncensored
 Soft by Donja R. Love

2019–2020

 The Wrong Man by Ross Golan
 Seared by Theresa Rebeck
 All the Natalie Portmans by C.A. Johnson
 Nollywood Dreams by Jocelyn Bioh
 Perry Street by Lucy Thurber

2018–2019

 The Light by Loy A. Webb
 Alice by Heart by Duncan Sheik, Steven Sater and Jesse Nelson
 BLKS by Aziza Barnes
 Moscow Moscow Moscow Moscow Moscow Moscow by Halley Feiffer

2017–2018

Charm by Philip Dawkins
School Girls; Or, The African Mean Girls Play by Jocelyn Bioh
Relevance by JC Lee
Transfers by Lucy Thurber
Collective Rage by Jen Silverman
2016–2017
All The Ways to Say I Love You by Neil LaBute
Ride The Cyclone by Brooke Maxwell and Jacob Richmond
YEN by Anna Jordan
The End of Longing by Matthew Perry
2015–2016
The Legend of Georgia McBride by Matthew Lopez
Lost Girls by John Pollono
Smokefall by Noah Haidle
A Funny Thing Happened on the Way to the Gynecological Oncology Unit at Memorial Sloan-Kettering Cancer Center of New York by Halley Feiffer
2014–2015
The Money Shot by Neil LaBute
Punk Rock by Simon Stephens
The Nether by Jennifer Haley
Permission by Robert Askins
2013–2014
Small Engine Repair by John Pollono
Hand to God by Robert Askins
The Village Bike by Penelope Skinner
2012–2013
Don't Go Gentle by Stephen Belber
Really Really by Paul Downs Colaizzo
Reasons to Be Happy by Neil LaBute
2011–2012
The Submission by Jeff Talbott
Wild Animals You Should Know by Thomas Higgins
Carrie by Lawrence D. Cohen
2010–2011
The Break of Noon book by Neil LaBute
The Other Place by Sharr White
Side Effects by Michael Weller
2009–2010
Family Week book by Beth Henley
The Pride by Alexi Kaye Campbell
Still Life by Alexander Dinelaris
2008–2009
Coraline book by David Greenspan, music and lyrics by Stephin Merritt
Fifty Words by Michael Weller
The Third Story by Charles Busch
2007–2008
Spain by Jim Knable
Grace by Mick Gordon and A. C. Grayling
reasons to be pretty by Neil LaBute
2006–2007
In A Dark Dark House by Neil LaBute
A Very Common Procedure by Courtney Baron
Nixon's Nixon by Russell Lees
2005–2006
Some Girl(s) by Neil LaBute
The Wooden Breeks by Glen Berger
Colder than Here by Laura Wade
2004–2005
Last Easter by Bryony Lavery
Fat Pig by Neil LaBute
What of the Night based on the writings of Djuna Barnes
2003–2004
Bright Ideas by Eric Coble
Frozen by Bryony Lavery
The Distance from Here by Neil LaBute
2002–2003
Mercy Seat by Neil LaBute
Scattergood by Anto Howard
Intrigue with Faye by Kate Robin
2001–2002
The Glory of Living by Rebecca Gilman
Runt of the Litter by Bo Eason
A Letter from Ethel Kennedy by Christopher Gorman
2000–2001
A Place at the Table by Simon Block
High Dive by Leslie Ayvazian
The Dead Eye Boy by Angus MacLachlan
1999–2000
Trudy Blue by Marsha Norman
Sueño by Jose Rivera
Yard Gal by Rebecca Prichard
1998–1999
Wit by Margaret Edson
The English Teachers by Ed Napier
Angelique by Lorena Gale
1997–1998
Anadarko by Tim Blake Nelson
1996–1997
The Gravity of Means by John Kolvenbach
Good as New by Peter Hedges1995–1996Nixon's Nixon by Russell Lees
The Grey Zone by Tim Blake Nelson
Three in the Back, Two in the Head by Jason Sherman1994–1995Girl Gone by Jacquelyn Reingold1993–1994The Able Bodied Seaman by Alan Bowne
Liar, Liar by Dael Orlandersmith1992–1993Five Women Wearing the Same Dress by Alan Ball
D Train by James Bosley and Fay Simpson1991–1992A Snake in the Vein by Alan Bowne1987–1988'Beirut'' by Alan Bowne

Awards and nominations

References

External links 
 Official website

Theatre companies in New York City